Our Kid Eh is the second album from the spoof band the Shirehorses, comprising two BBC Radio 1 DJs, Mark Radcliffe and Marc Riley (a.k.a. Mark and Lard). This album's title is a play on the name of Radiohead's 2000 album Kid A. Our Kid Eh reached #20 on the UK Albums Chart.

Track listing 
"If You Tolerate This Piss" - Manic Street Sweepers - 3:29 ("If You Tolerate This Your Children Will Be Next" - Manic Street Preachers) - An unhappy drinker in a student union bar laments the poor quality of the alcoholic beverages on sale.
"No Big Sizes" - Radioshed - 3:08 ("No Surprises" - Radiohead)
"Arseholes' - Robbie & William - 3:30  ("Angels" - Robbie Williams) - An unhappy gay couple express (in graphic detail) dissatisfaction with each other's physical attributes.
"Why Is It Always Dairy Lea" - Dave Lee Travisty - 2:48 ("Why Does It Always Rain On Me?" - Travis; the artist refers to 1980s Radio 1 DJ Dave Lee Travis) - A touring band express dissatisfaction with the various brands of processed cheeses provided on their rider in lieu of the traditionally made cheeses they requested.
"Fucking Around" - Dave Lee Travisty - 2:40 ("Coming Around" - Travis)
"Pardon?" - Indecipherable Boys - 1:59 ("Intergalactic" - Beastie Boys)
"Quorn Medley" - Status Quorn - 2:49 (Medley of "Whatever You Want", "Paper Plane", "Rockin' All Over The World", "Down Down", "Caroline" - Status Quo)
"Bellow" - Foreplay - 3:17 ("Yellow" - Coldplay)
"A Roll with It" - Po-Fasis - 2:31 ("Roll with It" - Oasis)
"Horny" - Chocolate Mousse Tea - 1:47 ("Horny" - Mousse T. Vs Hot 'n' Juicy)
"Feel Like Shite" - Doofergrass - 1:56 ("Alright" - Supergrass)
"Country Spouse" - Blurb - 2:53 ("Country House" - Blur)
"Tony" - M&M Featuring Bridie From The Canteen - 6:23 ("Stan" - Eminem featuring Dido) - A seemingly deranged individual named Tony stalks Mark Radcliffe.
"Planet Of Sound" - The Pixiedancers - 2:05 ("Planet of Sound" - Pixies)

Information in brackets indicates original songs and artists.

2001 albums
Shirehorses albums
2000s comedy albums